Harini (born 30 April 1979) not to be confused with singer Harini Ivaturi  is an Indian film playback singer and classical singer who sings in Tamil,  Hindi, Telugu and Kannada films, working with many leading film composers. She is married to another playback singer, Tippu.

Harini learnt Carnatic music from Gowri and Radha Viswanathan from the age of four. In her later years, she learned from Sudha Raghunathan and currently from Suguna Purushotthaman. She used to participate in school competitions and in one such competition which she won, A. R. Rahman who distributed the prizes invited the winners to his studio to record their voices. Subsequently, she was called by Suhasini Maniratnam to sing "Nila Kaigirathu" for her first film Indira. Her first song, "Nila Kaigirathu", was recorded at the age of 15. Since then, she has received offers from various music directors across South India. Within a career spanning a decade, she sang over 3500 film songs and several album songs, most of them in Tamil.

Discography

Tamil/Hindi/Malayalam/Kannada

Telugu 

Harini rendered a series of devotional songs in 2012 on Lord Amman, Ganesha, Perumal among others, titled Om Nava Sakthi Jaya Jaya Sakthi, Vindhaigal Purindhai Nee En Vazhville, and Uchi Pillaiyare Charanam along with ace singer P. Unni Krishnan. The music was composed and produced by Manachanallur Giridharan.

Television songs
Kolangal - 2003
Hello Shyamala- 2018

Awards and recognitions
Harini has been the recipient of several popular awards in the singing category. Some of her awards are as listed below:
 2003 – Tamil Nadu State Film Award for Best Female Playback for Aalanguyil (Parthiban Kanavu)
 1997 – Tamil Nadu State Film Award for Best Female Playback for Manam Virumbuthe (Nerukku Ner)
 2004 – ITFA Best Female Playback Award
 2000 – Silver Screen MGR Award (in Singapore)
 1999 – Pace Award
 1998 – Roja Award
 1997 – Madras Cultural Academy Awards

References

External links 
 

Indian women playback singers
Tamil playback singers
Kannada playback singers
Living people
1979 births
Tamil Nadu State Film Awards winners
Telugu playback singers
Singers from Chennai
Tamil singers
Women musicians from Tamil Nadu
21st-century Indian women singers
21st-century Indian singers